"Where Are You Now (My Love)" is a 1965 song written by Tony Hatch and Jackie Trent, and recorded in December 1964 by Trent. The single gave Trent her only No. 1 hit when it reached the top of the UK Singles Chart for one week in May 1965. The song was featured in the popular television series It's Dark Outside.

"Where Are You Now" was Hatch and Trent's first composition together, and one of many hits they would have as a song writing partnership. Although Trent released two follow-up singles, these were only minor hits in the UK. The song was written and recorded in just four days after Hatch was asked by Granada TV to produce a song for the female lead in the programme to be seen on screen playing to herself. The lyrics were written by Trent in December 1964 (around Christmas), and she recorded the song in December 1964 just before she headed off to South Africa on a three-month tour. When the song first hit the screen, people contacted TV Times to ask where they could get it and the rush was on to get it into the shops. The song went to number 1 in May 1965 and, according to some UK Charts, it knocked The Beatles's "Ticket to Ride" off the number one spot.

A duet with Hatch, "The Two of Us", later achieved success on the Australian chart.

References

1965 singles
Songs written by Tony Hatch
UK Singles Chart number-one singles
Songs written by Jackie Trent
1965 songs